Ecklonia is a genus of kelp (brown algae) belonging to the family Lessoniaceae.

The genus name of Ecklonia is in honour of Christian Friedrich Ecklon (1795–1868), who was a Danish botanical collector and apothecary.

The genus was circumscribed by Jens Wilken Hornemann in Kongl. Danske Vidensk. Selk. Naturvidenskab. Math. Afh. Vol.3 on pages 385-388 in 1828.

Known species
 Ecklonia biruncinata
 Ecklonia brevipes
 Ecklonia cava
 Ecklonia fastigiata
 Ecklonia kurome
 Ecklonia maxima
 Ecklonia muratii
 Ecklonia radiata
 Ecklonia stolonifera
 Ecklonia radicosa

Ecklonia species produce eckol-type phlorotannins. The name of this genus honours Christian Friedrich Ecklon (1795-1868)  the Danish pharmacist, botanist and plant collector.

 synonyms
 Ecklonia bicyclis, a synonym of Eisenia bicyclis (Kjellman) Setchell 1905, the arame

References

External links 

 
Laminariales genera